Blackwell High School may refer to one of several high schools in the United States:

Blackwell High School (Oklahoma) — Part of the Blackwell Public Schools in Blackwell, Oklahoma
Blackwell High School (Texas) — Part of the Blackwell Consolidated Independent School District in Blackwell, Texas

Furthermore, it may also refer to Hatch End High School in London, UK, after it was renamed.

See also
Bartlett High School (Bartlett, Tennessee), formerly known as Nicholas Blackwell High School